Macroglossum alluaudi is a moth of the family Sphingidae. It is known from the Seychelles.

There are three orange-yellow lateral spots on the abdomen. The forewing upperside is without a discal spot, but there are two heavy straight discal lines. The basal half of the forewing underside (apart from discal cell) is washed with pale chrome-yellow. The hindwing upperside is chrome-yellow, slightly shaded with orange distally. The fringe is brown, sometimes with a narrow brown marginal band. The hindwing underside is mostly washed with pale chrome-yellow.

References

 Pinhey, E. (1962): Hawk Moths of Central and Southern Africa. Longmans Southern Africa, Cape Town.

Macroglossum
Moths described in 1893
Fauna of Seychelles
Taxa named by Joseph de Joannis